Sarrat, officially the Municipality of Sarrat, is a 4th class municipality in the province of Ilocos Norte, Philippines. According to the 2020 census, it has a population of 25,186 people.

The town is known as the birthplace of Ferdinand Marcos, the 10th President of the Philippines and for Sarrat Church, the largest church in the province and with the longest nave in the country and an Important Cultural Property of the Philippines.

Etymology
Cabayugan was how the people called Sarrat by its first settlers led by the village chief Minagel (Maingel) Bang'at and his wife Sarrah, before the arrival of the Spaniards on the latter part of the 16th century.  Sarrat is a compound of the couple's names and is believed to be coined by their son Garo.

History
Cabayugan or Sarrat was established in 1586 as an Augustinian visita of Laoag. It became an independent parish in 1724. Sarrat was annexed to San Nicolas on May 7, 1740. During the revolt of 1815, many houses were burned to the ground and the town was left in shambles. After the revolt, the poblacion was transferred to its present site.

Upon the partition of Ilocos province in 1818, Sarrat was designated as the capital of Ilocos Norte until its transfer to Laoag within the year.

It boasts of a colorful and violent history: the whole town joined the Basi Revolt of 1807; rose up in arms again in 1815 during the Sarrat Rebellion of which the hated housekeeper of the parish priest, Rosa Agcaoili, was killed and dismembered; and revolted against the Americans in 1899 under the leadership of Don Pepe Ver. In 1910, the court returned Sarrat's church and convent to the Catholics and a day later, the Aglipayan parish priest, Fr. Mariano Edralin, was found murdered. The beautiful church of Santa Monica was started to be built by Fr. Isidro Champaner (OSA) in 1848. It is probably the biggest Spanish-era church in Ilocos Norte. Its original roof truss of logs is still intact.

After the colonization of the Spaniards, the town was renamed to San Miguel when the Augustinians erected a parish coinciding with the gaining of its township status on September 29, 1724.  Two then Senators, Santiago Fonacier and Isabelo delos Reyes, eventually created the bill that changed the town's name from San Miguel to Sarrat in 1916.

Sarrat's former names were Cabayugan meaning place where bayug (a kind of bamboo) grows, San Miguel de Cunning (meaning “saffron” which used to be harvested abundantly in the region) and San Miguel de Sarrat. Its name was changed from San Miguel to Sarrat in 1916.

The Sarrat Heroes monument erected at the town plaza symbolizes the heroism and bravery of all Sarrateños.  "Ritritem'mon Kayong" was their war cry that still echoes on the true-blooded Sarrateños.

Geography
Sarrat is situated geographically just southeast of Laoag City, the capital of the province. Sarrat is bounded by the cities and municipalities of Batac to the south-west, San Nicolas to the west, Laoag to the north-west, Piddig to the north-east, Dingras to the east, the town of Marcos to the southeast, and a small portion of Banna to the south.  The town is traversed and divided into two by the Padsan River, creating a north and south areas that are connected by the Sarrat Bridge.

Barangays
Sarrat is politically subdivided into 24 barangays. These barangays are headed by elected officials: Barangay Captain, Barangay Council, whose members are called Barangay Councilors. All are elected every three years.

Climate

Demographics

Economy

Tourism

Santa Monica Parish Church

The Santa Monica Parish Church, commonly known as the Sarrat Church, is the largest church in Ilocos Norte and the most visited place by tourists in Sarrat.  The church has one of the longest nave in the country and was declared an Important Cultural Property of the Philippines in September 2009.

The 105-meters long (the longest in the country) Church of St. Monica, first built in 1779 by the Augustinian friars, was the last Spanish church built in the Ilocos. It was destroyed on March 3, 1816, was rebuilt in 1848, burned again in 1882, repaired from 1875 to 1895 and finished between 1895 and 1898. Its bell tower was damaged during the March 19, 1932 earthquake. It has a unique, massive, 3-level and attractive brick staircase connecting the church with the convent.  On one side of the church is the eight-foot high image of St. Monica. The church interior, along with the houses surrounding the plaza, were renovated in 1983 for Irene Marcos' (the youngest daughter of the late Pres. Marcos) wedding to Greggy Araneta. A few months later, on August 16, an Intensity 7.8 earthquake severely damaged the church's main altar and upper facade.

The impressive convent, known as the Casa del Palacio Real, was first built in 1779, completely burned on February 3, 1816, and was reconstructed in 1817 and 1886.  It was, at times, used as a Presidencia Municipal during the American era.  Within its environs, then were a jail where criminals and political prisoners were incarcerated and tortured, a sala court, a strangulation room and other secular sections. It also served, for a time, as the Colegio de Santa Monica (a branch of the Liceo de Manila).  The convent was damaged during the March 19, 1932 earthquake and was repaired, in turns.  In 1977, both church and convent were completely restored, with government assistance.  The ground floor houses church memorabilia, church vestments and historical books and photographs.  Souvenir items (T-shirts) are also sold here.

The former 3-storey, square brick belfry of diminishing sizes, probably the largest in the province, has lost its top storeys.  It once had a clock on the dome.

Santa Monica Parish Museum
The Santa Monica Parish Museum is a repository of artifacts and memorabilia that dates back to the construction of the church edifice in 1779.  It was established in 1993 on the initiative of its parish priest, Rev. Msgr. Jacinto A. Jose and Rev. Edmundo M. Abaya, D.D., Bishop of the Diocese of Laoag.

It was completed and put in its present form in 1997 with the help of the Kannawidan Foundation Inc., The iloko Foundation for Arts and Culture. This organization is dedicated to the preservation of the cultural and historical heritage of the people of Ilocos Norte under the following officers and directors. Francis Ablan, Maximino J. Edralin, Rosie Mata Castro, Georgia Balmaceda Alviar, Lita Marcos Roque, Amparo Javier Araullo, Rolando P. Dela Cuesta, Wenceslao Agnir Jr., Caesar Agnir, Roxanne A. De la Cuesta, Arnold Segundo and Guia M. Valenciano

Nipa hut cottages
The nipa hut cottages along the banks of the Padsan River are another visitor attraction in the town.  It is located at barangay San Joaquin (Barrio Uno) and is maintained by private entrepreneurs from the same barangay.  These nipa huts are seasonal: built around December purposely for the summer season and are dismantled at the start of the rainy season.  The nipa huts not only offer shade and comfort to the visitors but are equipped with Videoke system to complete the entertainment.

Culture

|}

Government

Sarrat, belonging to the first congressional district of the province of Ilocos Norte, is governed by a mayor designated as its local chief executive and by a municipal council as its legislative body in accordance with the Local Government Code. The mayor, vice mayor, and the councilors are elected directly by the people through an election which is being held every three years.

Elected officials

Transportation 
Going around the poblacion is served by the tricycles (Filipino: traysikel), a local term for a motorized transport made by pairing a motorcycle with a locally fabricated sidecar.  These are also used to transport commuters to other remote barangays but usually through a special fare, the amount of which depends on what is agreed upon before the trip.

A regular and daily trip to neighboring Laoag City is provided by jeepneys, the main form of transportation.  All jeepneys that ply the route are members of the Laoag-Sarrat Jeepney Operators and Drivers Association (LSJODA).  Travel time takes around 15 minutes each way on a usual day.

Education
Sarrat offers its constituency up to secondary education. Tertiary and higher educations are provided by the neighboring Laoag City.

Primary and elementary schools
 Binaratan Elementary School
 South Central Elementary School
 North Central Elementary School
 Cabuloan Elementary School
 Golgol Elementary School
 Pandan Elementary School
 Parang Elementary School
 Patad Elementary School
 Ruiz Elementary School
 Sagpatan Elementary School
 San Antonio Elementary School
 San Bernabe Elementary School
 Sarrat Central School
 Sarrat North Central School
 Sta Rosa Elementary School
 San Pedro Public School
 San Andres Public School

High schools
 Sarrat National High School
 Santa Rosa National High School

Notable personalities
Ferdinand E. Marcos, the 10th President of the Republic of the Philippines.
Fabian C. Ver, a former General and Chief of the Armed Forces of the Philippines.
Maximino Jamias Edralin, notable Philippine Journalist and Public Relations Officer

See also
List of renamed cities and municipalities in the Philippines

Notes

Bibliography

External links

Municipality of Sarrat
[ Philippine Standard Geographic Code]
Local Governance Performance Management System

Municipalities of Ilocos Norte